Tyler Carron (born May 11, 1989) is an American ice sled hockey player.
Carron was born in Berthoud, Colorado. He is a bilateral amputee after a being struck by a car in high school. He won a gold medal with the American team at the 2014 Winter Paralympics and was also the member of the US ice hockey team which secured record 4th Winter Paralympic gold medal during the 2018 Winter Paralympics. Carron was banned for 18 months between March 2018 and September 2019 after testing positive for methadone at the 2018 Paralympic Games in Pyeongchang. He was also stripped of the gold medal won at the Games.

References

External links 
 
 

1989 births
Living people
American sledge hockey players
Paralympic sledge hockey players of the United States
Paralympic gold medalists for the United States
Ice sledge hockey players at the 2014 Winter Paralympics
Para ice hockey players at the 2018 Winter Paralympics
Medalists at the 2014 Winter Paralympics
Ice hockey players from Colorado
Paralympic medalists in sledge hockey
People from Berthoud, Colorado